19th-Century Music is a triennial academic journal that "covers all aspects of Western art music composed in, leading to, or pointing beyond the "long century" extending roughly from the 1780s to the 1930s." The Journal is "interested equally in the music that belongs to the era and in the impact of the era's music on later times, media, and technologies." It is published by University of California Press and was established in 1977. The editor-in-chief is Lawrence Kramer.

Abstracting and indexing
The journal is indexed in:
Scopus
Arts and Humanities Citation Index
Current Contents/Arts & Humanities

EBSCO databases
ProQuest databases

References

External links

Publications established in 1977
Triannual journals
Music journals
English-language journals
University of California Press academic journals
1977 establishments in California